The Dunham classification system for carbonate sedimentary rocks was originally devised by Robert J. Dunham in 1962, and subsequently modified by Embry and Klovan in 1971 to include coarse-grained limestones and sediments that had been organically bound at the time of deposition. The modified Dunham Classification has subsequently become the most widely employed system for the classification of carbonate sedimentary rocks with 89% of workers currently adopting this system over the alternative Folk classification scheme

History

Original classification 
Robert J. Dunham published his classification system for limestone in 1962. The original Dunham classification system was developed in order to provide convenient depositional-texture based class names that focus attention on the textural properties that are most significant for interpreting the depositional environment of the rocks.

The three criteria used to define the original Dunham classes were:
 the supporting fabric of the original sediment
 the presence or absence of mud (the fraction <20 μm in size)
evidence that the sediments were organically-bound at the time of deposition

On the basis of these criteria, the following four classes were defined:
 Mudstone  a mud-supported carbonate rock containing <10% grains
 Wackestone  a mud-supported carbonate lithology containing >10% grains
 Packstone  a grain-supported fabric containing 1% or more mud-grade fraction
 Grainstone  a grain-supported carbonate rock with <1% mud.

Recognising that these classes did not encompass all carbonate lithologies, Dunham defined two additional classes within his scheme:
 Boundstone  where there is any evidence that the carbonate sediments were bound at the time of deposition
 Crystalline dolomite or Crystalline limestone  where recrystalisation has resulted in the original depositional fabric of a carbonate rock cannot being identified

Dunham specifically stated that, where appropriate, these six textural class names are intended to be combined with modifiers describing grains and mineralogy. The original classification can be summarized as follows:

Modification by Embry and Klovan (1971) 
Following the publication of the original Dunham Classification System a number of modifications were proposed. The most widely adopted of these has been that of Embry and Klovan (1971) who recognized that the Dunham classification scheme lacked detail when it came to the description of organically-bound and coarse-grained limestones.

Embry and Klovan proposed the subdivision of the Dunham 'boundstone' category on the basis of the means by which the sediment was organically-bound, thus yielding three new classes within the Dunham boundstone class:
 Bafflestone  autochthonous organically- baffled sediments 
 Bindstone  matrix-supported sediments that have been stabilized by encrustation and binding
 Framestone  sediments with a rigid fossil-supported framework
Recognising that the identification of these structures is problematic at the limited scale of a petrographic thin section and typically requires examination of outcrop exposures or core, Embry and Klovan stated that where the mode of binding is not identifiable then the original Dunham classification term boundstone should be retained.

To address the issue of coarse-grained allochthonous limestones (lithologies where >10% of the components are >2 mm in diameter), Embry and Klovan proposed the introduction of two further new classes:
 Rudstones  textures where the >2 mm grain-size fraction supports the framework
 Floatstones  matrix-supported textures with the >2 mm grains appearing to 'float' in a finer-grained matrix

As with the original Dunham classification, modifiers should be employed to enhance the classification. Additionally, the class names should be employed as textural modifiers to describe the matrix. Embry and Klovan also redefined 'mud matrix' as material with a diameter of <30 μm.

Following the wide adoption of the Embry and Klovan (1971) modifications, the Dunham Classification system is typically referred to as the 'modified Dunham Classification System' with both Dunham (1962) and Embry and Klovan (1971) being cited.

It can be summarized as follows:

.

Revised classification by Wright (1992) 
A revised classification was proposed by Wright (1992). It adds some diagenetic patterns and can be summarized as follows:

References

Sedimentary rocks
Limestone
Petrology